This is a list of members of the sixth North West Provincial Legislature, as elected in the election of 8 May 2019 and taking into account changes in membership since the election.

Current composition

|-style="background:#e9e9e9;"
!colspan="2" style="text-align:left"| Party !! style="text-align:center"| Seats 
|-
|  || 21
|-
|  || 6
|-
|  || 4 
|-
|  || 2
|-
|colspan="2" style="text-align:left"| Total || style="text-align:right"| 33 
|}

Graphical representation
This is a graphical comparison of party strengths as they are in the 6th North West Provincial Legislature.

Note this is not the official seating plan of the North West Provincial Legislature.

Members

Two ANC members were sworn into the legislature during the term as the result of casual vacancies in ANC seats: Lenah Miga joined in September 2020, following the death of Gordon Kegakilwe; Nono Maloyi joined in November 2022, following the resignation of Kim Medupe; and Lazarus Mokgosi joined in December 2022, following the resignation of Mmaphefo Matsemela.

References

Legislature